The Last Will and Testament of Herbert Macaulay contained instructions from Nigerian nationalist Herbert Macaulay to his family and Nigerians about his last wishes.

Text
Herbert Macaulay's will is transcribed below: 
This is the last WILL and TESTAMENT of me HERBERT SAMUEL HEELAS MACAULAY, Civil Engineer of Kirsten Hall, Balbina Street, in the Colony of Lagos, in the Country of Nigeria, in the West Coast of Africa, made this 6th day of May in the year of our Lord, One Thousand Nine Hundred and Forty-Six. 

I hereby appoint and make Isaac Babalola Thomas, Editor and Proprietor of the Akede Eko, resident at 116 Igbosere Road Lagos, aforesaid, the sole Executor and Trustee of this my last WILL and TESTAMENT. 

All previous WILL whatsoever made my by me at any place so ever, in various and varied circumstances so ever are hereby revoked. 

I give devise and bequeath unto NIGERIA - Political and the Population thereof. All my love without rserve half of what remains should go to NIGERIA - Commercial; and the other half to NIGERIA - Physical; if there is anything yet remaining - it may go to MISS "NIGERIA" of the Daily Comet. 

I give, devise and bequeath unto my detractors, inimical friends, antagonist and particularly those who had at any time so ever, libeled my good name or labeled it BAD, my free and frank forgiveness and pardon as it is humanly possible to have and to hold, till death do then snatch. 

I give devise and bequeath unto the LAGOS TOWN COUNCIL, all that piece of Parcel of Land, situate and being at IKOYI CEMETERY, measuring seventy-two inches by forty-eight inches on the surface, and as deep as the regulations allow, or their affection for me can justifiably allow, wherein shall lay my bones, muscles, sinews and earthly frame, to hold and tend, to preserve, present and exhitibe in constant neat and decent condition unto the inhabitants of Lagos, to the casual visitor or Novel resident in Lagos and from generation unto generation. 

I give, devise and bequeath unto the Beardless and Youthful Mallams of the North, my Treasured Moustache to emulate and copy, and withal to note that as the moustache and my Bow tie are both parallel and inseparable on my dress and person; so shall they be at par, and united with their Southern Brethren. 

To all HATERS OF AFRICA and AFRICANS, I pronounced an ANATHEMA, I give the Curse of Paul on Alexander the Coppersmith - I devise the injuction of Aged (2nd Tim. IV:14). 

David in re-ultimate fate of Joab and Shimer (1st King 11, 6  & 9) and I BEQUEATH unto them the plagues of Egypt, the Bubonic of Oko-Awo, and the Yellow Fever of Ogbomoso!

To every full-blooded African, I give and bequeath an annuity of 365 cheery days, 52 merry weeks and 12 happy months, to commence on the  eighty-second day after my demise. 

TO "OGEDENGBE" - my pact and tact 
TO "NIMBE" - my haunt and vaunt 
TO "DOYIN" - my pluck and luck 

I give and devise and  bequeath unto the Nigerian National Democratic Party - Longevity and Magnanimity of Spirit, and also the Proprietorship of the "LAGOS DAILY NEWS" - all other things being equal.

I give, devise and bequeath unto the United Native African Church Mission, the essence of my lecture now in their possession delivered in September 1941, on the occasion of the Golden Jubilee of that Mission. 

I give and devise unto the NCNC my last orders to operate on my death “MARK TIME FOR FOUR DAYS - ADVANCE TO VICTORY, GOD’S SPEED”

To Nnamdi Azikiwe my last injunction

In witness whereunto I set my hands this 6th day of May, 1946 
(Sgd) H. MACAULAY, 
Testator

Before and in the presence of us both who are present at the same time.

GABRIEL (Luminary Avenue Paradise) 
CYGNUS (The Milky Way) His Star Angel 
Witness to Marks;- Theodisius the Scribe (Mortal)

Their Angelic X Marks

References

Macaulay, Herbert